Norman Thomas "Turkey" Stearnes (May 8, 1901 – September 4, 1979) was an American baseball outfielder in the Negro leagues. He was elected to the Baseball Hall of Fame in 2000.

Career
Born in Nashville, Tennessee, Stearnes acquired his nickname at an early age from his unusual running style. He began his career in professional baseball in 1920 with the Nashville Giants, then played for the Detroit Stars, beginning in 1923. In 1931, the Stars failed to pay Stearnes his salary because of the Great Depression, so he moved from team to team for the remainder of his career, retiring in 1942 as a member of the Kansas City Monarchs.

The Negro Southern League in 1932 was considered major league for just that year, owing to trouble from other leagues in staying afloat during the Great Depression. As such, the NSL had a Championship Series held, with matched Chicago against the Nashville Elite Giants. He played in two games and drove in five runs with seven hits. In his final postseason series appearance in 1939, he helped the Kansas City Monarchs to victory over St. Louis with three hits for five RBIs in five games. In five postseason series combined, he batted .417.

Stearnes is considered by some as one of the great all-around players in the history of baseball, but because of his race and his quiet personality, he never received the recognition that many believe he deserved. He batted over .400 three times and led the Negro leagues in home runs seven times. He is credited with 186 home runs in his Negro league career, the all-time Negro league record, and 7 more than second-place Mule Suttles. Since Negro league seasons were very short, sometimes lasting fewer than 30 games, it is unclear how many home runs Stearnes might have hit in a 154-game major league season. The 175-pound Stearnes was a fast baserunner despite his awkward-looking running form, and was one of the best outfielders of his generation. In 2001, writer Bill James ranked Stearnes as the 25th greatest baseball player of all-time and the best left fielder in the Negro leagues.

Stearnes' known career statistics include a .349 batting average, 186 home runs, 984 games, and a .617 slugging percentage.

He led Negro league baseball in triples six times (1923–1925, 1927, 1934, 1936), which is the most all-time. In light of Major League Baseball announcing several of the Negro Leagues from 1920-1948 as major leagues, Stearnes now shares the record for most times leading a league in triples with Sam Crawford. He is one of nine players in Negro league baseball history to have won multiple batting titles, with only Josh Gibson and Oscar Charleston having more than Stearnes, who won twice.

Other work and later life
Despite his accomplishments, Stearnes had to work winters in Detroit's auto plants to survive, primarily in a factory owned by Walter Briggs, who was the owner of the Detroit Tigers, a team he couldn't play for because he was black.

Stearnes was inducted into the Hall of Fame in 2000, 21 years after his death in Detroit. His wife, Nettie Mae, a schoolteacher, who was instrumental in her husband's posthumous induction, died in 2014.

A plaque in Stearnes' honor is on display outside the center field gate at the Tigers' home field, Comerica Park.

A display in Stearnes' honor is on display along the 3rd base concourse at The Corner Ballpark presented by Adient (the Historic Site of Old Tiger Stadium) at the intersection of Michigan and Trumbull Avenues.

References

External links

 and Baseball-Reference Black Baseball stats and Seamheads
  and Seamheads
Negro Leagues Museum bio

National Baseball Hall of Fame inductees
Detroit Stars players
Detroit Stars (1937) players
Kansas City Monarchs players
Chicago American Giants players
Philadelphia Stars players
Baseball players from Nashville, Tennessee
Leopardos de Santa Clara players
1901 births
1979 deaths
American expatriate baseball players in Cuba
Lincoln Giants players
20th-century African-American sportspeople